{|{{Infobox Aircraft Type
|type=Glider
|national origin=Poland
|manufacturer=SZD
|designer=Bogumił Szuba
|first flight=31 December 1958<ref name=bab>

Further reading
 Taylor, J. H. (ed) (1989) Jane's Encyclopedia of Aviation. Studio Editions: London. p. 29
 "Modelarz" No 4 / 60 (April 1960)

External links

http://www.the-blueprints.com/blueprints/modernplanes/modern-su-sz/18739/view/szd_19_zefir_2a/
 Newsreel from 1963 WGC in Junin, Argentina - archival footage of Zefir 2A
Video of an restored Zefir 2A

1950s Polish sailplanes
1960s Polish sailplanes
Aircraft first flown in 1958